WP Rocket is an open-source web performance premium plugin for WordPress. The plugin uses caching to accelerate website loading times.

Launched in July 2013, WP Rocket has over 1.6 million active installs.

History 
WP Rocket is the first product of WP Media, a company created in 2014 that provides software to optimize web performance. WP Media is headquartered in Lyon, France, and has an employee base working remotely in multiple locations throughout the world.

After the launch of WP Rocket, the company released other software.

In 2020, WP Media launched RocketCDN, a content delivery network service.

In May 2021, WP Media was acquired by the group.ONE.

Usage 
In June 2021, WP Rocket is the 7th most popular WordPress plugins and powers 3.69% of the top 1M websites in the world.

Licensing 
WP Rocket is free software released under GNU General Public License version 2. WP Rocket source code is publicly available from its GitHub repository.

References

WordPress